John Goldsmith Downs (August 20, 1873 – January 25, 1956) was an American farmer and politician from New York.

Life 
Downs was born on August 20, 1873, on a farm in Cutchogue, New York, the son of Henry V. Downs and Patience Hallock.

Downs worked as a farmer in Cutchogue, and was the president of the Suffolk County Agricultural Society for many years. He was also a trustee and vice-president of the Southold Savings Bank and a director of the Suffolk County Mutual Insurance Company of Southold.

In 1918, Downs was elected to the New York State Assembly as a Republican, representing the Suffolk County 1st District. He served in the Assembly in 1919, 1920, 1921, 1925, 1926, 1927, 1928, 1929, 1930, 1931, 1932, 1933, 1934, 1935, and 1936.

Downs was married to Edna Jones. She died in 1948.

Downs died at home on January 25, 1956. He was buried in Cutchogue Cemetery.

References

External links 

 The Political Graveyard

1873 births
1956 deaths
People from Cutchogue, New York
Farmers from New York (state)
20th-century American politicians
Republican Party members of the New York State Assembly
Burials in New York (state)
Politicians from Suffolk County, New York